Music in the Square (Italian: Musica in piazza) is a 1936 Italian "white-telephones" comedy film directed by Mario Mattoli and starring Milly, Ugo Ceseri and Enrico Viarisio.

In Bevagna near Perugia, two cousins are rival musicians - one dedicated to classical music the other to modern light music.

Cast
Gemma Bolognesi
Guido Celano
Ugo Ceseri
Mino Doro
Anna Maria Dossena
Carlo Duse
Achille Majeroni
Milly
Maria Raspini
Ermanno Roveri
Agostino Salvietti
Enrico Viarisio

References

Bibliography 
 Roberto Chiti & Roberto Poppi. I film: Tutti i film italiani dal 1930 al 1944. Gremese Editore, 2005.

External links 
 

1936 films
Italian black-and-white films
1930s Italian-language films
1936 comedy films
Films directed by Mario Mattoli
Italian comedy films
1930s Italian films